Haider Guillermo Palacio Álvarez (born July 22, 1979) is former Colombian footballer who played as a left back.

Career
Palacio has played football as a left back for Unicosta, Deportivo Cali and Junior de Barranquilla. He won two league titles with Junior (in 2004 and 2010) before moving to Cúcuta Deportivo in January 2011.

He has been capped by the Colombia national football team for 2006 Qualifiers and Copa Oro 2005.

Honors
Champion of Copa Mustang in 2004 with Junior

References

External links

1979 births
Living people
Colombian footballers
Deportivo Cali footballers
Atlético Junior footballers
Cúcuta Deportivo footballers
Categoría Primera A players
Colombia international footballers
2004 Copa América players
2005 CONCACAF Gold Cup players
Association football defenders
Footballers from Barranquilla